The Ionikos Nikaias B.C. 2008–09 season, was the 2008–09 season of the Greek basketball club Ionikos Nikaias.

Season results

League standings
Greek C League (Greek 4th Division):

South - Group 2

Game by game results

Greek C LEAGUE CUP results

2008–09